La Marseillaise is a French newspaper established in 1943.

References

Newspapers published in France
1943 establishments in France
Newspapers established in 1943
French-language newspapers
Mass media in Marseille